Golichina Mamsam is a popular meat dish in Telangana, India. Golichina means fry in Telugu  and it is made with local spices. It is a simple yet fiery mutton dish that goes well with either rice or paratha.

References

Telangana cuisine
Indian meat dishes